City Hall Park, also known as Courthouse Park, is a  park in the Pioneer Square neighborhood of Seattle, Washington, United States. It sits on a block bounded by 3rd Avenue on the southwest, Dilling Way on the southeast, 4th Avenue on the northeast, and the King County Courthouse on the northwest. The park so named because when it was laid out in 1916, the King County Courthouse was the County-City Building, housing both Seattle and King County government. City offices moved out in 1962.

The park had a 70-person homeless encampment until it was removed by Seattle Parks and Recreation in August 2021 following a letter signed by 33 King County Superior Court judges was transmitted to the city government. The letter had been written in response to crimes that affected courthouse operations for employees and jurors. City Hall Park was subsequently fenced off for cleaning and remained closed for over a year. The King County government proposed a land swap to transfer control of the park to them in November 2021, which drew criticism from several King County Council members and advocacy groups. The county council approved the transfer and explored proposals to prevent the park from becoming an encampment again, including a courtyard with permanent fencing, a hygenie station, and monitoring from the King County Sheriff's Office. The transfer was cancelled in October 2022 after a Seattle City Council vote against the proposal.

References

External links
 
 Seattle Department of Parks and Recreation

parks in Seattle
Pioneer Square, Seattle